Judicial Council may refer to:

 Canadian Judicial Council
 Judicial Council of California 
 Kosovo Judicial Council
 Supreme Judicial Council of Libya
 Muslim Judicial Council
 Supreme Judicial Council of Pakistan
 Supreme Judicial Council of Saudi Arabia
 High Judicial Council (Syria)
 Judicial Council of the United Methodist Church
 Judicial council (United States)

See also 
 Council of the judiciary
 Judiciary committee (disambiguation)
 National Judicial Council (disambiguation)